Sodium hydroselenide is a chemical compound, an inorganic salt; each unit consists of one sodium, one selenium, and one hydrogen atom.

Production
Sodium hydroselenide can be made by reducing selenium with sodium borohydride: 
 Se + NaBH4 → NaSeH + BH3(g)

Alternatively it can be made from sodium ethoxide exposed to hydrogen selenide: 
 NaOEt + H2Se → NaSeH + HOEt

Sodium hydroselenide is not made for storage, instead it is used immediately after production in a fume hood thanks to the appalling odour of hydrogen selenide.

Properties
Sodium hydroselenide dissolves in water or ethanol. In humid air sodium hydroselenide is changed to sodium polyselenide and elemental selenium.

Sodium hydroselenide is slightly reducing.

Use
In organic synthesis, hydrogen sodium hydroselenide is a nucleophillic agent for insertion of selenium.

References

Sodium compounds
Selenides